Los Llanos Formation is a geological formation in the  in La Rioja Province, northwestern Argentina whose strata date back to the Campanian stage of the Late Cretaceous.

Los Llanos Formation over the years has been controversially described as ranging from Late Cretaceous to Miocene, but the Miocene succession was assigned to Las Mulitas Formation in 2019. The formation rests on top of the Early Permian Los Sauces and Patquía Formations and in parts on Ordovician crystalline basement.

The sandstones and conglomerates of the formation were deposited ij a fluvial environment. The sites were encountered on top of areas characterized by hydrothermal activity as geysers and other vents, suggesting a preferred location for the incubation of the dinosaur eggs. Apart from fossil eggs, the formation has provided fossil flora and ostracods. The crocodyliform Llanosuchus, described in 2016 from the formation, was named after Los Llanos Formation.

Description 

The Los Llanos Formation was first formally described by Bodenbender in 1911. The formation crops out in very localized patches in the south of La Rioja Province. Los Llanos Formation is found on the western and eastern slopes of the eponymous Sierra de Los Llanos, in the Sierra de Chepes, Sierra Ulapes, Sierra de Velasco and Sierra Brava.

Between the original definition of "Los Estratos de Los Llanos" (Los Llanos Beds) by Bodenbender and later analysis during the twentieth century, a number of controversies arose. Rusconi (1936), Bordas (1941), Pascual (1954), Guiñazú (1962) and Zuzek (1978) assigned a Miocene age to the formation, based on mammal fossils found in the strata. This unit is presently known as the Las Mulitas Formation. The occurrence of typical Cretaceous charophytes confirms the assigned age for Los Llanos Formation.

Los Llanos Formation unconformably overlies the Permian Los Sauces Formation in the Sierra de Velasco and the Permian Patquía Formation or Ordovician granitic basement in other places.

It comprises lightgrey and orange sandstones with basal conglomerate beds, deposited in a fluvial environment, which in the Sanagasta park is associated with hydrothermal activity.
 The more than 90 sauropod nests were found in direct association with these hydrothermal vents, suggesting a preferred incubation location of the mother dinosaurs.

Paleontological significance 

The formation has provided fossilized nesting sites attributed to a titanosaurid dinosaur. Research conducted in 2015 by Hechenleitner et al. include a comparison with the Cretaceous Sanpetru Formation of Hațeg paleo-island in Romania, the Tremp Formation of the Spanish Pre-Pyrenees and the Boseong Formation of the Gyeongsang Basin in South Korea.

Fossil content 
The following fossils were reported from the formation:
 Dinosaurs
Aeolosaurini indet.
Titanosauria indet.
Abelisauridae indet.
Reptiles
 Crocodyliforms
 Peirosauridae indet.
Llanosuchus tamaensis
 Oofossils
 Faveoloolithidae indet.
 Invertebrates
 Ostracods
 Ilyocypris triebeli
 Wolburgiopsis neocretacea
 Flora
 Gobichara (Pseudoharrisichara) groeberi
 Lychnothamnus (Pseudoharrisichara) tenuis
 Lychnothamnus (Pseudoharrisichara) walpurgica

See also 
 List of dinosaur-bearing rock formations
 Allen Formation, Campanian to Maastrichtian fossiliferous formation of the Neuquén Basin
 Anacleto Formation, Campanian ooliferous formation of the Neuquén Basin
 Angostura Colorada Formation, Campanian to Maastrichtian fossiliferous formation of the North Patagonian Massif
 La Colonia Formation, Campanian to Maastrichtian formation of the Cañadón Asfalto Basin
 Colorado Formation, Campanian to Maastrichtian fossiliferous formation of the Colorado Basin
 Lago Colhué Huapí Formation, Campanian to Maastrichtian fossiliferous formation of the Golfo San Jorge Basin

References

Bibliography 

 
 
  
  
 
 
 
 
 

Geologic formations of Argentina
Upper Cretaceous Series of South America
Cretaceous Argentina
Campanian Stage
Sandstone formations
Conglomerate formations
Fluvial deposits
Ooliferous formations
Fossiliferous stratigraphic units of South America
Paleontology in Argentina
Geology of La Rioja Province, Argentina